Pseudoturritis turrita is a species of plant belonging to the family Brassicaceae.

Its native range is Central and Southern Europe to Transcaucasus, Algeria.

Synonyms:
 Arabis turrita L.

References

Brassicaceae